The Sustut Group is a geologic group in British Columbia. It preserves fossils dating back to the Cretaceous period. The leptoceratopsid Ferrisaurus and the turtle Basilemys have been recovered from the group.

See also

 List of fossiliferous stratigraphic units in British Columbia

References
 

Cretaceous British Columbia